Ottorino Piotti (born 31 July 1954) is an Italian former professional footballer, who played as a goalkeeper. He made 200 appearances in Serie A, most notably for Avellino, Milan and Atalanta, during the late 1970s and 1980s.

Honours

Club 
A.C. Milan
Serie B: 1980–81, 1982–83
Mitropa Cup: 1982

External links 
Profile at MagliaRossonera.it 

Profile at EmozioneCalcio.it 

1954 births
Living people
Italian footballers
Serie A players
Serie B players
Association football goalkeepers
Como 1907 players
U.S. Avellino 1912 players
A.C. Milan players
Atalanta B.C. players
Genoa C.F.C. players
S.G. Gallaratese A.S.D. players